In geometry, an affine plane is a two-dimensional affine space.

Examples
Typical examples of affine planes are
Euclidean planes, which are affine planes over the reals equipped with a metric, the Euclidean distance. In other words, an affine plane over the reals is a Euclidean plane in which one has "forgotten" the metric (that is, one does not talk of lengths nor of angle measures). 
 Vector spaces of dimension two, in which the zero vector is not considered as different from the other elements
 For every field or division ring F, the set F2 of the pairs of elements of F
 The result of removing any single line (and all the points on this line) from any projective plane

Coordinates and isomorphism
All the affine planes defined over a field are isomorphic. More precisely, the choice of an affine coordinate system (or, in the real case, a Cartesian coordinate system) for an affine plane P over a field F induces an isomorphism of affine planes between P and F2.

In the more general situation, where the affine planes are not defined over a field, they will in general not be isomorphic. Two affine planes arising from the same non-Desarguesian projective plane by the removal of different lines may not be isomorphic.

Definitions
There are two ways to formally define affine planes, which are equivalent for affine planes over a field. The first one consists in defining an affine plane as a set on which a vector space of dimension two acts simply transitively. Intuitively, this means that an affine plane is a vector space of dimension two in which one has "forgotten" where the origin is. In incidence geometry, an affine plane is defined as an abstract system of points and lines satisfying a system of axioms.

Applications
In the applications of mathematics, there are often situations where an affine plane without the Euclidean metric is used instead of the Euclidean plane. For example, in a graph, which can be drawn on paper, and in which the position of a particle is plotted against time, the Euclidean metric is not adequate for its interpretation, since the distances between its points or the measures of the angles between its lines have, in general, no physical importance (in the affine plane the axes can use different units, which are not comparable, and the measures also vary with different units and scales).

Sources

References

Planes (geometry)
Mathematical physics